Charles William Taussig (born August 9, 1896 - May 10, 1948) was an American writer and manufacturer. He was President of American Molasses Company (Grandma's Molasses, since 2006 owned by B&G Foods) and early Brain Trust advisor to Franklin Delano Roosevelt.

Taussig also attended the founding of the United Nations (April-June 1945) as a member of the US delegation.

References

External links
 

1896 births
1948 deaths
Writers from California